Lespezi River may refer to:

Lespezi, a tributary of the Argeș in Argeș County
Lespezi, a tributary of the Izvorul Alb in Bacău County
Lespezi, a tributary of the Olteț in Gorj County
Lespezi, a tributary of the Râul Târgului in Argeș County

See also 
 Lespezi (disambiguation)